Lloyd House may refer to:

People
Lloyd House (politician), Arizona state representative from 1967 to 1968

Buildings
in the Netherlands
Lloyd Hotel, Dutch national monument in Amsterdam

in the United Kingdom
Lloyd House, Birmingham

in the United States (by state then city)
Harold Lloyd Estate, Beverly Hills, California, listed on the National Register of Historic Places (NRHP) in Los Angeles County
Lloyd House, Pasadena, California, a dormitory in the House system at Caltech
Jason Skinner House, Harwinton, Connecticut, also known as Lloyd House, NRHP-listed
Lloyd–Bond House, Lloyd, Florida, listed on the NRHP in Jefferson County
Henry Demarest Lloyd House, Winnetka, Illinois, listed on the NRHP in Cook County
James M. Lloyd House, Mt. Washington, Kentucky, listed on the NRHP in Bullitt County
Chase–Lloyd House, Annapolis, Maryland, a National Historic Landmark and NRHP-listed in Anne Arundel County
Harold Lloyd Birthplace, Burchard, Nebraska, listed on the NRHP in Pawnee County 
Joseph Lloyd House, Huntington, New York, listed on the NRHP in Suffolk County
Leech–Lloyd Farmhouse and Barn Complex, Lima, New York, listed on the NRHP in Livingston County
Thomas F. Lloyd Historic District, Carrboro, North Carolina, listed on the NRHP in Orange County
Mason–Lloyd–Wiley House, Chapel Hill, North Carolina, historic house, home of Thomas F. Lloyd
Lloyd–Howe House, Pinehurst, North Carolina, listed on the NRHP in Moore County
John Uri Lloyd House, Cincinnati, Ohio, listed on the NRHP in Hamilton County
Lloyd House (Alexandria, Virginia), listed on the NRHP